The 1963 Bucknell Bison football team was an American football team that represented Bucknell University during the 1963 NCAA College Division football season. Bucknell finished second in the University Division of the Middle Atlantic Conference.

In its sixth season under head coach Bob Odell, the team compiled a 6–3 record. Thomas Boyd and William Swineford were the team captains.

Bucknell's 3–1 record against division opponents seemingly set the stage for a thrilling season-ender against undefeated Delaware, with a share of the conference championship at stake. The season ended prematurely, however, with the assassination of John F. Kennedy the day before kickoff. Initially, Bucknell announced the game would be played, but late on Friday night – after most other conferences and colleges had decided to cancel their games, but too late to catch the Blue Hens before they arrived in Western Pennsylvania – they reversed that decision. Bucknell offered Delaware the option to make up the game after Thanksgiving, but Delaware coach Dave Nelson declined, saying waiting that long, and playing a football game with a national tragedy so fresh in everyone's memory, would be "anticlimactic".

Bucknell played its home games at Memorial Stadium on the university campus in Lewisburg, Pennsylvania.

Schedule

References

Bucknell
Bucknell Bison football seasons
Bucknell Bison football